EasyTag (stylised as EasyTAG) is a graphical tag editor that is part of the GNOME project.  EasyTag runs on Linux and Microsoft Windows, and there was an attempt to bring EasyTAG to OS X circa 2014. It is written in C and relies on GTK+ and id3lib for graphics and ID3 tag handling respectively. As of version 2.1.1, EasyTag also uses the tag manipulation library provided by the MAD project, for support of ID3v2.4.

EasyTag is free and open-source software subject to the terms of the GNU General Public License version 2 or any later version.

Features
 Supported formats: MP3, MP2, FLAC, Opus, Speex, Ogg Vorbis, MP4, MPC, APE and WavPack
 Available tag fields (depending on format): Title, Artist, Album, Disc Album, Year, Track Number, Genre, Comment, Composer, Original Artist, Copyright, URL, Encoder and Picture
 Automated tagging using presets and custom masks
 Rename files using tag information or external text files
 Apply changes in a field (Artist, Album...) to all selected files
 Read and display file header information (bitrate, time...)
 CDDB support
 Tree based browser or a view by artist and album
 Recursion into subdirectories
 Playlist generator
 Undo/redo function

See also
 List of tag editors
 ID3
 M3U

References

External links

2000 software
Free audio software
Free software programmed in C
GNOME Applications
Tag editors
Tag editors for Linux
Tag editors that use GTK